Leonardo Costas (born 26 May 1966 in Argentina) is an Argentinean retired footballer who last worked as head coach of CD Costa do Sol in Mozambique.

Career

Costas started his senior career with Racing Club de Avellaneda in the Argentine Primera División, where he made sixty-three appearances and scored two goals. After that, he played for Locarno, Club Atlético Banfield, Defensa y Justicia, Club Almagro, and CSyD Tristán Suárez.

References

External links 
 "He would bring me Milito" 
 Fabio Costas, a racinguista in Mozambique 
 The Apertura tournament. Another blow to Costas's mind
 After all, Leonardo Costas was fired via phone! 
 Leonardo Costas designs competitive Costa do Sol

Argentine footballers
Living people
1966 births
Racing Club de Avellaneda footballers
Association football midfielders